is a Japanese anime series, directed by Yuu Kou and Junichi Sato and produced by Zexcs. It began airing on Chubu-Nippon Broadcasting on June 24, 2009. An unaired episode was featured in the final DVD volume, released on March 26, 2010. The anime is based on a pachinko game manufactured by Sanyo Bussan.

Plot
The story centers on Marin and Urin, two “pure” mermaid sisters who live alongside the fish in the sea, but yearn to be in the world beyond the water and above ground. One day, a beautiful ring falls in the middle of the sea, and Marin and Urin retrieve it. The two decide to leave their waterbound world for the first time to deliver the ring. After an arduous journey, they come across an isolated island where a high school girl named Kanon lives.  Urin accidentally unleashes Sedna, a powerful entity sealed a long time ago on the island and in the sea, and the only ones who can defeat her are Marin and Kanon, as priestesses of the sea and the sky.

Mentored by the Elder Turtle, the girls fight various sea creatures that Sedna has transformed into monsters, but Urin's growing jealousy of Kanon and inability to fight on her own draws Sedna to corrupt her. Taking the role of priestess of darkness and Sedna's host body, Urin releases Sedna's sea half to restore her full strength and declares Marin and Kanon her enemies. The despair from losing her sister and her own inability to cope with darkness causes Marin to lose her powers. Kanon similarly despairs over her fear of making meaningful connections with people and driving them away, in particular her distant ex-boyfriend, Kojima.

While Kanon works to develop her powers and help Marin regain hers, the Elder Turtle is adamant that Urin is a lost cause and focuses on stopping Sedna by force, as previous priestesses had done, even if it kills her host. After confronting her own insecurities, Kanon helps Marin come to terms with her fear, and she regains her powers. They are determined to save Urin, but Sedna absorbs their magic and destroys the stones they use to transform. Confronted with Sedna's darkness, Marin and Kanon realize that Sedna is actually the combined sorrow the islanders committed to the sea, afraid to face what was in their hearts--she's not evil, but a necessary part of humanity. With this knowledge and the experience gained from their journey, Marin and Kanon help the islanders accept Sedna back into their hearts, freeing a remorseful Urin and letting Sedna disappear peacefully. Marin and Urin soon return to the sea, but Kanon will never forget them and admits to Marin that she loves her.

Characters
 

A sea dweller who lives with Urin, Sam, and Warin. While people of the sea are born from shells and thus lack parents or direct family, she considers Urin her sister, whom she showers with affection. When Kanon's ring is thrown into the sea, she is the one who finds it and decides to search for its owner. Later, she becomes the priestess of sea and starts fighting Sedna along with Kanon.

 

A high school senior who lives at the island. She is the owner of the ring that Marin found (it was a gift from her boyfriend), which she angrily discarded when she decided to break up. After Urin unleashes the power of Sedna, she becomes the priestess of sky.

 

A sea dweller whom Marin sees as her little sister, and who sees Marin as her big sister. She is the one who accidentally unleashes Sedna's power. In the middle of the series, she becomes Sedna's vessel.

 

A sea dweller, friend of Marin and Urin, and frequent companion of Sam.

 

Another sea dweller who is a friend of Marin and Urin, and frequent companion of Warin.

 

An old turtle whose form was a statue in the island's forest until it came to life when Sedna was unsealed. Speaking human language, he advises Marin and Kanon regarding their roles as priestesses, comes to live in Kanon's house, and can generate the fireball needed for one of Kanon's spells.

 

Kanon's ex-boyfriend. He and Kanon have some feelings toward each other, and Kojima once gave Kanon a ring, but at the start of the series, Kanon ended their relationship over due to tensions regarding how it was evolving.

 

A schoolmate of Kanon and Kojima, she is romantically interested in Kojima (and tries to be conspicuous about this), though he does not share her feelings. She considers Kanon to be her rival for Kojima's affections.

 

A schoolmate and close friend of Kanon.

 

Kanon's mother, who typically sports a carefree attitude, as well as a penchant for seeing opportunities for money-making. She uses a special golden ring to make delicious pickles, in a recipe passed down in the family.

 

An evil spirit sealed away in part on the island and in part in the sea. The seal on Sedna is broken as Marin and Urin are trying to retrieve Kanon's ring.

 

Matsumoto's daughter. Unlike her father, Ichikawa does not speak a human language. She enjoys Miyako's pickles.

Manga
Two manga adaptations of Umi Monogatari were serialized in two different magazines by different publishers. The first one, with the title Umi Monogatari ~Anata ga Ite Kureta Koto~, follows the same story as the anime. The second, titled Umi Monogatari: Minna Aishiteru! (Sea Story: Everyone, I love you!), has a yonkoma format and follows Marin and Urin's experiences on the island.

The first manga, illustrated by Akira Katsuragi, was serialized in Mag Garden's Monthly Comic Blade magazine. The second manga, illustrated by Tonmi Narihara, was serialized in Futabasha's Comic High! magazine.

Music
The anime uses two theme songs. Lantis has released three soundtracks for Umi Monogatari ~Anata ga Ite Kureta Koto~. The first, "violet", was released on July 23, 2009. The second, was released on August 5, 2009. The third, was released on August 26, 2009.

References

External links
 Official anime site 
 Official HICBC site 
 Official Lantis Net Radio website 
 

2009 manga
Futabasha manga
Mag Garden manga
Magical girl anime and manga
Shōnen manga
Seinen manga
TBS Television (Japan) original programming
Zexcs